Monsoon Shootout is a 2013 Indian Hindi-language neo-noir action thriller film written and directed by Amit Kumar and produced by Guneet Monga, Trevor Ingma, Martijn de Grunt, and co-produced by Anurag Kashyap, and Vivek Rangachari, starring Vijay Varma, Geetanjali Thapa, Sreejita De, Nawazuddin Siddiqui and Tannishtha Chatterjee in the lead roles.  The film received positive reviews at the 2013 Cannes Film Festival in the Official Midnight Screenings section. Belonging to the school of Parallel cinema, Monsoon Shootout was released worldwide four years later on 15 December 2017 to positive reviews.

Plot
As the raging monsoon lashes Mumbai, the commercial and mafia capital of India, the police struggle to keep up with the gangsters who are ever more emboldened. Aditya “Adi”, a principled rookie cop as his first assignment on the force, joins an elite, anti-extortion unit of the Mumbai police led by Khan, a cop in the ‘Dirty Harry’ mold. On his first evening on the job, Adi had planned to meet his ex-lover Anu and to get back with her, but he misses the date when Khan has set up an ambush for a dreaded gangster.

However, the ambush goes wrong, and Adi chases Shiva, a seemingly armed and dangerous criminal, into a dead-end alley. Unsure if Shiva is, indeed, the wanted gangster, Adi has a moment of reckoning; whether to shoot or not to shoot. Whatever his decision is, every decision will take him on a journey that pits him against a system which demands a compromise of his morals. As he lives through the dramatic consequences of each decision, he realizes that every choice has its price.

Cast
 Nawazuddin Siddiqui as Shiva
 Vijay Varma as Aditya (Adi)
 Tannishtha Chatterjee as Rani
 Neeraj Kabi as Inspector Khan
 Geetanjali Thapa as Anu
 Sreejita De as Geeta
Nalneesh Neel as Goon
Prithvi Zutshi as Minister
 Farhan Mohammad Hanif Shaikh as Chhotu, Shiva's son
 Surya Mohan Kulshreshtha (Baba) as Tiwari, builder
 Neha Gupta as Tiwari's wife
 R. Balasubramanian as Dagar bhai
 Irawati Harshe Mayadev as DCP Nishi
 Onkar Das Manikpuri as a taxi driver
 Jayant Gadekar as Patil, constable
 Niranjan N. Asrani as Police Commissioner
 Rohit Nitin Arekar as Pinto
 Pravina Deshpande as Adi's mother
 Shruti Bapna as Jemina Joseph
 Chandrakant Taneja as Magistrate Naik
 Honey Chhaya as Paradise Lodge manager
 Akhilesh Tiwari as paanwala
 Bhagwan Das as a blind beggar
 Mukesh Kumar as a one-armed beggar
 Raj Rao as ox-cart driver
 A. R. Rama as a rider
 Raghuvir as Nepali guard
 Mohit Chauhan as Ali, builder
 Akriti as Ali's wife
 Banwarilal Jhol as a chauffeur 
 Adi Vyom as Inspector Khan's son
 Anupama Minz as Khan's wife
 Edith Minz as Khan's mother-in-law
 Tishya Tara as Khan's daughter

Production and development
Director Amit Kumar stated that after he saw Robert Enrico's Oscar-winning short film An Occurrence at Owl Creek Bridge, he became interested and fascinated by the idea of human decision-making, and how quickly can one make a very difficult decision when one's life is at stake. This idea came to fruition in the form of Monsoon Shootout.

Kumar had previously assisted film director Asif Kapadia on his BAFTA-winning feature The Warrior where he met Trevor Ingman. Ingman decided to help seek finances for Kumar's film starting in 2008, but was unable to do so because of the closure of the UK Film Council which was initially supposed to cover half the production costs. Kumar set sights to find an Indian production partner, and in 2010, he ran into Guneet Monga who had produced Michael Winterbottom's Trishna. When Kumar stated his lack of an Indian producer, Monga immediately jumped at the opportunity to fund the film. However, the producers decided that although they loved Kumar's script and idea, they felt he needed to cast a star in the lead role. Kumar worked with Nawazuddin Siddiqui in his student short film The Bypass and decided to cast him in the lead role.

Reception
The Times of India's Lasyapriya Sundaram rated the film 3/5, praising the cinematography of Rajeev Ravi and Vijay Varma's debut performance in a lead role. She opines that "while the idea hooks the viewer, what fails the film is its execution", also critiquing that "since the actors reprise their roles thrice over, they often don't have enough screen time to flesh out their characters adequately".

Saibal Chatterjee writing in NDTV headlines the review saying, "Nawazuddin Siddiqui's Noir Thriller Is Absorbing, Even Startling". He describes the film as "Shot through with stylistic flourishes and narrative sleights that frequently add up to arresting images and moments, first-time director Amit Kumar's niftily crafted Monsoon Shootout is absorbing, even startling. The propulsive, crisply edited noir thriller set in Mumbai's dark, dank and dangerous underbelly is consistently intriguing on account of its structure. Add to this the film's all-around technical finesse and the near-flawless performances from the principal actors and you have a crime drama that has the feel of a veritable tour de force." He praises the score by Gingger Shankar, defining it as pulsating with the energy that adds a throbbing soundscape to the film. Rating it as 3/5, he recommends the film to viewers saying "Don't prevaricate or duck for cover. Walk right into the path of this slickly staged shootout. You won't regret the decision."

Shalini Langer writing in The Indian Express, finds the film somewhat lacking in consistency but overall praises the director, actors and especially the cinematographer Rajeev Ravi for capturing the unglamorous side of Mumbai in all its ambiguity.

Mint's Uditi Jhunjhunwala finds the film "a technically accomplished, but emotionally wanting, noir thriller".

Cannes reception
The film was shown during the French 2013 Cannes Film Festival in theMidnight Screenings section. Early Cannes reception for the film has been positive with many international critics taking a liking to the film's noir, artistic detailing.

British newspaper The Guardian'''s Peter Bradshaw gave a very positive first look review of the film stating that it's "a brash exploitation picture, a violent thriller on the tough streets of Mumbai about rule-breaking, bone-breaking cops" and "an entertaining popcorn movie with a twist, for which commercial success is on the cards." He described the film as "Dirty Harry meets Sliding Doors."The Hollywood Reporter'''s Deborah Young described the film as "a ferocious Mumbai cops and gangsters drama, and a satisfyingly arty plot that turns in on itself to examine the outcome of three possible choices a rookie cop might make when he confronts a ruthless killer. Three times the story returns to a key moment: a boy with a gun uncertain whether to pull the trigger." She had major praise for Nawazuddin Siddiqui's performance, stating that "Most memorable of all is Siddiqui, who is every inch an unstoppable force of nature, and lucky we are that so much of the violence he wreaks happens off-camera."

Soundtrack
The soundtrack was released by Saregama Music.

Accolades

References

External links
 

2010s Hindi-language films
2013 films
Indian neo-noir films
Film noir
2013 crime thriller films
Indian avant-garde and experimental films
Indian crime thriller films
Indian crime action films
2013 crime action films
Indian action thriller films
Indian nonlinear narrative films
Films about criminals
Films set in Mumbai
Films about organised crime in India
Crime films based on actual events
Fictional portrayals of the Maharashtra Police
2010s avant-garde and experimental films
2013 directorial debut films
2013 action thriller films